Žiga Živko (born 21 July 1995) is a Slovenian footballer who plays as a defender.

Honours
Maribor
Slovenian Championship: 2013–14, 2014–15
Slovenian Supercup: 2013, 2014

References

External links
NZS profile 

1995 births
Living people
Slovenian footballers
Association football defenders
NK Maribor players
NK Nafta Lendava players
Zalaegerszegi TE players
Slovenian PrvaLiga players
Slovenian Second League players
Nemzeti Bajnokság I players
Slovenia youth international footballers
Slovenian expatriate footballers
Slovenian expatriate sportspeople in Hungary
Expatriate footballers in Hungary